Crenicichla prenda is a species of cichlid native to South America. It is found in the upper Uruguay River basin.

References

prenda
Taxa named by Carlos Alberto Santos de Lucena
Taxa named by Sven O. Kullander
Fish described in 1991